The Science Party, formerly known as Future Party, is an Australian political party that was established on 2 July 2013. The founding leader, James Jansson, was studying for his Doctorate at the Kirby Institute during the party's formation, with a focus on advancing Australian society through technical and long-term solutions. On 22 March 2016, the name was changed to The Science Party after registering with the Australian Electoral Commission. The Science Party has run candidates for the 2013, 2016 and 2019 Federal elections, as well as several By-elections in between.

The party was de-registered on 12 January 2022 by the Australian Electoral Commission for failing to meet the increased registration requirement of 1,500 members. It later merged with other parties to become the Fusion Party.

Political philosophy 
The Science Party believes that technological development is a positive force in human affairs and values the cultural, economic and technological benefits of modernism. It believes in freedom of expression and has a positive view of the power of free markets and the benefits of high density cities. The party seeks to promote high quality science research and education.

Policies 
Science Party policies include the following:
 Opposition to unnecessary regulations of new technology
 Opposition to government monitoring of data and criminalisation of journalism
 Greater transparency and openness in government
 Increased science research funding
 New charter city including a university
 Higher density residential development
 High quality internet and internet freedom
 Nuclear fusion and fission research
 Emissions trading and renewable energy
 Greater space research and industry
 A higher quality education system
 An Australian republic
 Democratic reform to both houses of parliament
 Simplified tax system
 High-speed rail
 Rapid approval for driverless cars

Elections

Federal elections

2013 federal election 
The Science Party first ran in the 2013 federal election as The Future Party. The party ran two candidates for the senate in NSW, and one in the New South Wales seat of Kingsford Smith and another in the Queensland seat of Moreton The party has been involved in Glenn Druery's Minor Party Alliance, though it refused to engage in any large scale preference deal.

2016 federal election 
In the 2016 federal election, the Science Party fielded two candidates each for the senate in NSW and Tasmania and one in Victoria. To avoid being placed in the ungrouped column, the Victorian and NSW candidates shared the column with the candidate from the Australian Cyclists Party. Together, they received 0.22% of the vote in Australia; 0.41% in NSW, 0.33% in Victoria, and without a shared column in Tasmania, received 0.39% of the vote.

For the House of Representatives, ten candidates ran in NSW: Berowra (receiving 2.1% of votes), Cunningham (2.6%), Grayndler (1.3%), Greenway (1%), Kingsford Smith (2.2%), North Sydney(1.8%), Sydney (1.6%), Warringah (0.9%), Watson (1.9%) and Wentworth (1.2%).

2019 federal election 
In 2019, four candidates ran for senate in NSW, receiving 0.4% of the total vote. In the lower house, five candidates from NSW were put forward and the results were: Berowra (1.56% of votes), Grayndler: (2.73%), Kingsford Smith (1.69%), Sydney (3.42%), Watson (2.23%), as well as one from VIC (Mallee, 0.53%) and one from WA (Perth, 1.52%).

By-elections 
2015 By-election: James Jansson ran under the title of The Future Party for North Sydney in NSW.

2017 and 2018 By-elections: The Science Party fielded Meow-Ludo Meow-Meow as a candidate in the 2017 New England by-election in response to the 2017–2018 Australian parliamentary eligibility crisis. He had previously been the Science Party candidate in the Division of Grayndler at the 2016 federal election. After subsequent resignations, the party fielded candidates in by-elections for the seats of Bennelong, Perth, Longman and Wentworth.

2020 By-election: James Jansson ran in Eden-Monaro (NSW) for the 2020 By-election, receiving 1.13% of the vote.

Electoral results

See also

 Candidates of the 2013 Australian federal election
 Candidates of the 2016 Australian federal election
 Candidates of the 2019 Australian federal election
 List of political parties in Australia

References

External links 
 Science Party Website
 Science Party YouTube Channel
 Science Party Twitter
 Science Party Facebook

2013 establishments in Australia
High-speed rail in Australia
Internet in Australia
Political parties established in 2013
Republican parties in Australia
Science and technology in Australia
Science in society
Secularism in Australia
Transhumanist organizations